Vietnamese people in Finland form one of the country's largest groups of Southeast Asian people. According to Statistics Finland, in 2017 there are 10,817 people with a Vietnamese background, 9,872 people whose mother tongue is Vietnamese, 8,012 people who have been born in Vietnam, and 5,603 people with Vietnamese citizenship residing in Finland. The Vietnamese-Finnish community includes both ethnic Vietnamese and Sino-Vietnamese.

Demographics

Religion 
The majority of the Vietnamese in Finland are Mahayana Buddhist, with a 12% Christian minority.

Notable Finnish people of Vietnamese descent

See also
 Finland–Vietnam relations

References

Sources

 

Ethnic groups in Finland
Finland